Chinese Serial  was the first Chinese newspaper in Hong Kong, since the Treaty of Nanjing. Founded in August 1853 and published by Ying Wa College in binding-book style. It introduced Western history, geography and sciences to Chinese readers, as well as reporting the latest news in China and the West. The paper was written mainly in Chinese, although some stories were in English. The paper was the first Chinese newspaper to have ads.

History
Walter Henry Medhurst, a London-born missionary to China, was the first editor-in-chief of the paper. The publication terminated in May 1856 as Medhurst's successor James Legge, the third to hold the editorship and then principal of Ying Wa College, was occupied with school management. 

A complete facsimile edition of the paper was published in 2006.

See also
List of newspapers in Hong Kong

References 
 《遐邇貫珍‧香港早期報刊簡介系列》, Hong Kong Central Library
 章遷，香港首份中文報《遐邇貫珍》, Ta Kung Pao

Studies  	 
 松浦章，內田慶市，沈国威，『遐邇貫珍の研究』，吹田市: 関西大学出版部，平成16 [2004].

Defunct newspapers published in Hong Kong
Culture of Hong Kong
Hong Kong society